The European Championship in Forestry Skills is a competition in forestry skills among students from European forestry and agricultural colleges, staged each year since 2002. The students are formed into teams and tested in various disciplines.

Goals 
The short‐term goal of the competition is the presentation of the latest achievements in logging techniques, logging machinery tools and loggers safety equipment and a comparison of these at an international level in theory and practice.

The long‐term aim of the competitions is to increase the appreciation of forest work and to draw general attention to forestry training and the forestry industry on both a national and international level. These competitions play a particularly significant role in creating international contacts between students and schools, which contribute to the furthering peaceful coexistence between nations.

Structure 
This competition is a team competition between schools of the EU. The best team from each country may attend the competition. Students who are in forestry training and between 16 – 25 years of age are eligible to compete. A team consists of four participants. Each participant must compete in theory and practice components.

In planning and carrying out the competitions, special attention is paid to safety aspects in working techniques.

The competition consists of two parts. First part is demonstrating specific knowledge of working with a chainsaw and consists of five disciplines (Fitting a new chain, Bucking by combined cut, Precision bucking, Undercut and Felling Cut, and Limbing).

The second part is demonstrating knowledge about forests. This part takes place over an approximately 3 km long orientation course, within which are 16 points. At each point the competitors must demonstrate their knowledge of forest surveying, or recognize tree and animal species, forest pests and diseases of trees. The winner is the one country whose competitors achieve the highest number of points from both parts.

Point scoring

Technical events – individual

Forestry course - team

Host nations and prize winners

References

External links 
 European Championship of Forestry Skills
 13th European Championship in Forestry Skills, Mals, Italy
 2015 competition, Estonia

Lumberjack sports
Forestry
Forestry
Forestry in Europe
Forestry education
Forestry events